Peter López Santos (born September 23, 1981) is an American-born citizen who is a Peruvian taekwondo fighter. He is most recognized for being a top international featherweight athlete for the Peruvian Taekwondo Team at present.

Biography
López was born in Irvine, California, in the United States, but aged five his family returned to live in Surquillo (Lima, Peru) for a few years.

It was in Peru that López started his first taekwondo class with his dad, who would later become his coach during the early years of his career as an athlete.

Eventually the family López returned to the U.S, where he began to competeand won 1998 Youth World Champion, Champion in the older category in 2001, bronze medal of the World Cup 2002, silver medal at the 2002 Pan American Championships and bronze medal at the 2003 World Championship, among others.

In 2004, the Peruvian Taekwondo Federation invited López to lead a training course. It was at this time that he decided to represent Peru. Despite this- the "club Elite" based in Texas- continues to support him. "It's like my family," López once said about this club.

According to the Peruvian Olympic Committee, of the 15 athletes who participated in the 2008 Beijing Olympics, López was the one that had the greatest chance of winning a medal in the 'feather' category (up to 68 kilos). López won his first two matches against Burak Hasan from Australia and  Isah Adam Muhammad from Nigeria before losing the semifinal matches against the American Mark Lopez. He would then dispute the bronze medal match against Servet Tazegül from Turkey where he lost by one point.

In 2011, he competed at the 2011 Pan American Games where he would also represent Peru in the 68 kilos category. He did not advance from the quarterfinals.

Lopez represented Peru at the 2012 London Olympics.

1981 births
Living people
Citizens of Peru through descent
Olympic taekwondo practitioners of Peru
Peruvian male taekwondo practitioners
Taekwondo practitioners at the 2007 Pan American Games
Taekwondo practitioners at the 2008 Summer Olympics
Taekwondo practitioners at the 2011 Pan American Games
People from Irvine, California
Pan American Games silver medalists for Peru
Taekwondo practitioners at the 2012 Summer Olympics
Pan American Games medalists in taekwondo
American sportspeople of Peruvian descent
South American Games gold medalists for Peru
South American Games medalists in taekwondo
Competitors at the 2010 South American Games
Medalists at the 2007 Pan American Games